"Deine Schuld" is a song by Die Ärzte. It is the second track on CD2 and the fourth single from their 2003 album Geräusch. It is a politically critical song about not doing anything to make the world better.

The video 

Band members are fishing. Near the end, the gravity shifts and everything flies up to a black cloud overhead.

Track listing 

 "Deine Schuld" (Urlaub) - 3:37
 "Biergourmet (unplugged)" (Die Ärzte/Felsenheimer) - 1:56
 "N 48.3 (unplugged)" (Urlaub) - 2:58
 "Frank'n'stein (Syllable-Jive-Version!)" (Felsenheimer) - 2:31
 "Deine Schuld (Video)" (Urlaub) - 3:55

B-sides 
The three songs Biergourmet, N 48.3 and Frank'n'Stein on the CD/7" are unplugged live versions.

 "Biergourmet" [Beer gourmet is originally from "5, 6, 7, 8 - Bullenstaat!".
 "N 48.3" is originally from "Runter mit den Spendierhosen, Unsichtbarer!".
 "Frank'n'stein" is originally from "Debil".

Personnel
Farin Urlaub – vocals, guitar
Bela B. – drums
Rodrigo González – bass

Charts

2004 singles
Die Ärzte songs
Songs written by Farin Urlaub
2003 songs